Galinstan (R) is a brand name for a alloy composed of gallium, indium, and tin which melts at  and is thus liquid at room temperature. However, it is not a eutectic alloy but a near eutectic alloy. The composition of both alloys is roughly the same, albeit the Galinstan (R), the technical product of a company, has likely additions of flux to improve flowability, reduce melting temperature, and reduce surface tension. The physical properties of the Galinstan (R) and the pure eutectic alloy EGaInSn thus differ slightly.

Galinstan is composed of 68.5%Ga, 21.5%In, and 10.0%Sn (by weight).

Due to the low toxicity and low reactivity of its component metals, in many applications, galinstan has replaced the toxic liquid mercury or the reactive NaK (sodium–potassium alloy).

Name
The name "Galinstan" is a portmanteau of gallium, indium, and stannum (Latin for "tin"). The brand name "Galinstan" is a registered trademark of the German company .

Physical properties
Boiling point: >1300°C
Vapour pressure: <10−8Torr (at 500°C)
Solubility: Insoluble in water or organic solvents
Viscosity: 0.0024Pa·s (at 20°C)
Thermal conductivity: 16.5W·m−1·K−1
Electrical conductivity: 3.46×106 S/m (at 20°C)
Surface tension: s = 0.535–0.718 N/m (at 20°C, dependent on producer)

Unlike mercury, galinstan tends to wet and adheres to many materials, including glass, which can limit its use as a direct replacement material in some situations.

Uses

The non-toxic galinstan replaces mercury in thermometers; the tube interior must be coated with gallium oxide to prevent it from wetting the glass.

Galinstan has higher reflectivity and lower density than mercury. In astronomy, it can replace mercury in liquid-mirror telescopes.

Metals or alloys like galinstan that are liquids at room temperature are often used by overclockers and enthusiasts as a thermal interface for computer hardware cooling, where their higher thermal conductivity compared to thermal pastes, and thermal epoxies can allow slightly higher clock speeds and CPU processing power achieved in demonstrations and competitive overclocking. Two examples are Thermal Grizzly Conductonaut and Coolaboratory Liquid Ultra, with thermal conductivities of 73 and 38.4 W/mK respectively. Unlike ordinary thermal compounds which are easy to apply and present a low risk of damaging hardware, galinstan is electrically conductive and causes liquid metal embrittlement in many metals including aluminum which is commonly used in heatsinks. Despite these challenges the users who are successful with their application do report good results.  In August 2020, Sony Interactive Entertainment patented a galinstan-based thermal interface solution suitable for mass production, for use on the PlayStation 5.

Galinstan is difficult to use for cooling fission-based nuclear reactors, because indium has a high absorption cross section for thermal neutrons, efficiently absorbing them and inhibiting the fission reaction. Conversely, it is being investigated as a possible coolant for fusion reactors. Its nonreactivity makes it safer than other liquid metals, such as lithium and mercury.

Galinstan is used as a liquid, deformable conductor in soft robotics and stretchable electronics.  Galinstan can be used to replace wires, interconnects, and electrodes as well as the conductive element in inductor coils and dielectric composites for soft capacitors.

X-ray equipment

Extremely high-intensity sources of 9.25 keV X-rays (gallium K-alpha line) for X-ray phase microscopy of fixed tissue (such as mouse brain), from a focal spot about 10 μm × 10 μm, and 3-D voxels of about one cubic micrometer, may be obtained with an X-ray source that uses a liquid-metal galinstan anode. The metal flows from a nozzle downward at a high speed, and the high-intensity electron source is focused upon it. The rapid flow of metal carries current, but the physical flow prevents a great deal of anode heating (due to forced-convective heat removal), and the high boiling point of galinstan inhibits vaporization of the anode.

See also

Field's metal, has a table of low melting point alloys
Rose's metal
Wood's metal

References

Sources

Gallium alloys
Tin alloys